International Transport Workers Federation v Viking Line ABP (2007) C-438/05 is an EU law case of the  European Court of Justice, in which it was held that there is a positive right to strike, but the exercise of that right could infringe a business's freedom of establishment under the Treaty on the Functioning of the European Union article 49 (ex Article 43 TEC). Often called 
The Rosella case or the Viking case, it is relevant to all labour law within the European Union (then including UK labour law). The decision has been criticised for the Court's inarticulate line of reasoning, and its disregard of fundamental human rights.

The Rosella was shortly followed by a case on freedom to provide services called Laval un Partneri Ltd v Svenska Byggnadsarbetareförbundet, and by the influential European Court of Human Rights decision in Demir and Baykara v Turkey.

Facts
Viking Line ABP operated a ship called The Rosella between Estonia and Finland. It wanted to operate under the Estonian flag so that it could use Estonian workers on lower wages than the higher Finnish wages for the existing crew. The policy of the International Transport Workers Federation (ITWF) was to oppose such "reflagging" for convenience by companies registering their ship abroad in a low labour cost jurisdiction, when their real seat is in another country. The Finnish Seamen's Union, a member of the ITWF, planned industrial action. The ITWF told its partners to not negotiate with Viking and hinder its business. Viking Line ABP responded by seeking an injunction in the English courts, claiming that the industrial action would infringe its right to freedom of establishment under TEC art 43, now TFEU art 49.

The High Court of Justice granted the injunction, but the Court of Appeal of England and Wales overturned the injunction on the balance of convenience. It held that there were important issues of EU law to be heard, given that, in the words of Waller LJ, it affected the "fundamental rights of workers to take industrial action". So it made a TEC article 234 reference (now article 267) to the European Court of Justice.

Judgment
The European Court of Justice held that, though it was for the national court to ultimately answer the question, it was possible that collective action taken by workers to protect their interests could be unlawful because it infringed the employer's interests under TFEU article 56. It could not be the case, in this situation that the workers' interests were sufficiently threatened, because the ECJ felt that the jobs and conditions of the workers' employment were not 'jeopardised or under serious threat'. It was the case that 'the right to take collective action, including the right to strike, must... be recognised as a fundamental right which forms an integral part of the general principles of Community law', but 'the exercise of that right may nonetheless be subject to certain restrictions... in accordance with Community law and national law and practices.'

Significance
The judgment of the European Court of Justice was met with widespread condemnation by labour law experts on the basis that it failed to give due regard for the respect of human rights and places business freedom above the interests of working people. It was one of the triggers for the UK's 2009 Lindsey Oil Refinery strikes. The ILO's Committee of Experts found severe breaches of the ILO Convention 87 on the freedom of association and protection of the right to organise. Thus it is generally viewed as being characterised by poor quality reasoning and is regarded by most commentaries as wrong.

See also

Secondary action
Regulatory competition
UK labour law
US labour law

EU legislation and case law
Posted Workers Directive
Laval un Partneri Ltd v Svenska Byggnadsarbetareförbundet [2008] IRLR 160 C-341/05, on free movement of services

ECHR cases
Associated Society of Locomotive Engineers and Firemen v United Kingdom [2007] IRLR 361
Wilson v United Kingdom (2002) 35 EHRR 20
Demir and Baykara v Turkey (2009) 48 EHRR 54

Notes

References
C Barnard, 'Social Dumping or Dumping Socialism?' (2008) 67 CLJ 262
C Barnard, 'The UK and Posted Workers: The Effect of Commission v Luxembourg on the Territorial Application of British Labour Law' (2009) 38 ILJ 122
A Dashwood, 'Viking and Laval: Issues of Horizontal Direct Effect' (2008) 10 Cambridge Yearbook of European Legal Studies 525
S Deakin, 'Regulatory Competition after Laval'  (2008) 10 Cambridge Yearbook of European Legal Studies 581
E McGaughey, A Casebook on Labour Law (Hart 2018) ch 10, 439

United Kingdom labour case law
Court of Justice of the European Union case law
2007 in case law
International Transport Workers' Federation
United Kingdom strike case law
2007 in British law
European Union labour case law
2007 in labor relations
Viking